Chukwudi Nworgu (born 12 December 1981) is a Nigerian retired professional footballer who played as a forward.

Career

Club

International
In November 2002, Nworgu made his debut for Nigeria in a 1–1 draw in a friendly match against Egypt.

Career statistics

International

Statistics accurate as of match played 11 June 2003

References

1981 births
Living people
Nigerian footballers
Association football forwards
Enyimba F.C. players
FC Metalurh Donetsk players
FC Vorskla Poltava players
Beitar Jerusalem F.C. players
FC Kryvbas Kryvyi Rih players
Hapoel Nof HaGalil F.C. players
Degerfors IF players
Syrianska FC players
Gröndals IK players
Ukrainian Premier League players
Israeli Premier League players
Russian First League players
Superettan players
Nigerian expatriate footballers
Expatriate footballers in Ukraine
Expatriate footballers in Russia
Expatriate footballers in Israel
Expatriate footballers in Sweden
Nigerian expatriate sportspeople in Ukraine
Nigerian expatriate sportspeople in Russia
Nigerian expatriate sportspeople in Israel
Nigerian expatriate sportspeople in Sweden
Nigeria international footballers
FC Spartak Nizhny Novgorod players